Tischeria elongata is a moth of the  family Tischeriidae. It is known from Guerrero in Mexico.

References

Tischeriidae
Moths described in 1914